This is a list of women artists who were born in Macedonia or whose artworks are closely associated with that country.

D
Iskra Dimitrova (born 1965), multimedia artist

H
Elpida Hadzi-Vasileva (born 1971), installation artist, based in the UK
Maja Hill (born 1976), painter, based in the UK

V
Keraca Visulčeva (1911–2004), painter

-
Macedonian women artists, List of
Artists
Artists